Patrick McFarlane (29 May 1932 – 25 October 2013) was an association footballer who represented New Zealand at international level.

McFarlane made his full All Whites debut in a 2–3 loss to Australia on 16 August 1958 and ended his international playing career with 7 A-international caps and 7 non cap earning appearances to his credit, his final cap an appearance in a 2-1 win over Tahiti on 12 September 1960.

Personal information
Born in Scotland, McFarlane migrated to New Zealand as a young man and worked as a tiling contractor in Dunedin. He was married to Mary with whom he had three children.

References

External links
Funeral Notice

1932 births
2013 deaths
New Zealand association footballers
New Zealand international footballers

Association football wing halves